The Scipio A. Jones House is a historic house at 1872 South Cross Street in Little Rock, Arkansas.  It is a -story masonry structure, finished in an elaborate interpretation of the Craftsman style with a variety of materials.  It has a clipped-gable roof covered with red tile, with a skirt of roofing extending across the front above the first floor.  The entrance is recessed under a stone-faced arch, which is flanked by stuccoed bays with bands of three sash windows.  The gable above also has a three-sash window group.  The house was built about 1928 for Scipio Jones, one of Arkansas' most prominent African-American lawyers and politicians of the period.

The house was listed on the National Register of Historic Places in 1999.

See also
National Register of Historic Places listings in Little Rock, Arkansas

References

Houses on the National Register of Historic Places in Arkansas
Houses completed in 1928
Houses in Little Rock, Arkansas
National Register of Historic Places in Little Rock, Arkansas
Individually listed contributing properties to historic districts on the National Register in Arkansas